In organic chemistry, an aldol describes a structural motif consisting of a 3-hydroxy ketone or 3-hydroxyaldehyde.  Aldols are usually the product of aldol addition. When used alone, the term "aldol" may refer to 3-hydroxybutanal.

Stereochemistry

Despite having only two functional groups, many aldols can have complicated structures arising from the relative positions of the OH group and the substituent between it and the carbonyl. Controlling reactions in order to favor the formation of one of these isomers is of great interest in the area of asymmetric synthesis.

Reactions
The chemistry of aldols is dominated by one reaction, dehydration:
RC(O)CH2CH(OH)R'  →  RC(O)CH=CHR'  +  H2O
Hydroxypivaldehyde is a rare example of a relatively robust aldol.

References

Aldehydes